The event list of the 2007 Bonnaroo Music Festival in Tennessee included:

June 15th

IDK where to add this but you are missing Ornette Coleman
https://www.reuters.com/article/entertainmentNews/idUSN1833717820070618 

(artists listed from earliest to latest set times)

What Stage:
Kings of Leon
The Roots
John Butler Trio
Tool (band)
Ziggy Marley
Ben Harper & the Innocent Criminals
The Police
Which Stage:
The Flaming Lips
RX Bandits
Brazilian Girls
Michael Franti and Spearhead
Manu Chao Radio Bemba Sound System
The String Cheese Incident
Regina Spektor
Old Crow Medicine Show
Damien Rice
Franz Ferdinand
The White Stripes
This Tent:
Ween
James Blood Ulmer
Tortoise
Hot Chip
Lily Allen
Aesop Rock
El-P
DJ Shadow
Unseen Vision
That Tent:
Galactic
Cold War Kids
Paolo Nutini
The Nightwatchman
The Black Keys
STS9
Spoon
The Other Tent:
Keller Williams
Xavier Rudd
Hot Tuna
Railroad Earth
Uncle Earl
The Richard Thompson Band
Gillian Welch, David Rawlings, and John Paul Jones
Dierks Bentley
Girl Talk
Sasha and John Digweed
SuperJam feat. Ben Harper John Paul Jones (musician) and Questlove
Somethin' Else:
Doug Wamble Quartet
Robert Glasper Trio
Downbeat Workshop
Robert Glasper Trio
Ravi Coltrane Quartet (2 Sets)
Mago featuring Billy Martin & John Medeski
Sonic Stage:
EOTO
The Little Ones
Apollo Sunshine
Uncle Earl
Annuals
The Whigs
Brazilian Girls
Michael Franti
Tea Leaf Green
The Bonnaroo Comedy Theatre:
Lewis Black & Friends (2 Sets)
David Cross (2 Sets)
Aziz Ansari
Finesse Mitchell
Lynne Koplitz
Dave Attell
Dov Davidoff
Nick Kroll
Demetri Martin
Flight of the Conchords
Blue Room Café:
Dave Barnes
Tenderhooks
Bang Bang Bang (band)
Bonnaroompah Band
Ben Jelen
Troo Music Lounge:
Tim Fite
Sam Champion
Alexa Ray Joel
Pieta Brown
Jennifer Niceley

Angel and the Love Mongers
Haale
benzos
Cinema Tent:
Current...TV
Down by Law
Go Further
Sneak Peek...HBO Presents Flight of the Conchords
Electric Apricot: Quest for Festeroo
Little Miss Sunshine
Current...TV
Borat: Cultural Learnings of America for Make Benefit Glorious Nation of Kazakhstan
Commando
Ghost Dog: The Way of the Samurai
4 AM FELLINI FREAKOUT: La Dolce Vita

References

2007 in American music
Bonnaroo Music Festival by year
2007 music festivals
2007 in Tennessee
Bonnaroo